Heikinlaakso (Finnish), Henriksdal (Swedish) is a northeastern neighborhood of Helsinki, Finland.

Politics
Results of the 2011 Finnish parliamentary election in Heikinlaakso:

National Coalition Party   29.3%
Social Democratic Party   21.6%
True Finns   17.8%
Green League   11.2%
Left Alliance   7.0%
Centre Party   5.6%
Christian Democrats   3.1%
Swedish People's Party   1.5%

Neighbourhoods of Helsinki